Cooksville is an unincorporated community in Heard County, in the U.S. state of Georgia.

History
A variant name was "Saint Cloud". A post office called Cooksville operated from 1872 until 1927. J. D. Cook, an early postmaster, gave the community his last name.

References

Unincorporated communities in Heard County, Georgia
Unincorporated communities in Georgia (U.S. state)